The Connecticut State Board of Education is the governing body of the Connecticut State Department of Education, which oversees the public education in the state, distribute funds to the state's 166 school districts, and operates the Connecticut Technical High School System.

The State Board of Education consists of fifteen members, at least two of whom have experience in manufacturing or a trade offered at the Technical High School System, one with a background in vocational agriculture and two nonvoting Grade 12 student members. The Governor appoints, with the advice and consent of the General Assembly, the members to the Board. The thirteen voting members are appointed to four-year terms, and the student members are appointed to one-year terms. The Commissioner of the Department of Higher Education serves as an ex officio, nonvoting member. The State Board of Education recommends to the Governor the appointment of the Commissioner of Education, who serves as the secretary to the Board for a term coterminous with that of the Governor.

Members (as of 2022)

References

External links
Official website

Connecticut State Department of Education
Connecticut
State Board